Dahrav (also Dagrav) is a village de facto in the Askeran Province of the breakaway Republic of Artsakh, de jure in the Khojaly District of Azerbaijan, in the disputed region of Nagorno-Karabakh. The village has an ethnic Armenian-majority population, and also had an Armenian majority in 1989.

History 
During the Soviet period, the village was a part of the Askeran District of the Nagorno-Karabakh Autonomous Oblast.

Historical heritage sites 
Historical heritage sites in and around the village include mural khachkars from 1081 and 1276, the 12th/13th-century church of Sren Nahatak, a 12th/13th-century chapel, a cemetery from between the 16th and 19th centuries, the 17th/18th-century shrine of Yeghtsahogh, an 18th/19th-century shrine, a 19th-century spring monument, the spring monument of Raffi from 1800, and the 19th-century St. John's Church.

Economy and culture 
The population is mainly engaged in agriculture and animal husbandry. As of 2015, the village has a municipal building, a house of culture, a school, and a medical centre.

Demographics 
The village had 216 inhabitants in 2005, and 179 inhabitants in 2015.

References

External links 
 
 

Populated places in Askeran Province
Populated places in Khojaly District